Pernell Saturnino (born 23 May 1962) is a percussionist from the Caribbean island of Curaçao. Saturnino joined the band Nos Antias as a teenager and toured the world with them. As part of Paquito D'Rivera's band, he won the Best Latin Jazz Album Grammy Award in 2007 for Funk Tango. He was nominated in the same category in 2006 for Diego Urcola's Viva.

References 

Living people
Curaçao musicians
Dutch percussionists
Berklee College of Music alumni
Grammy Award winners
1962 births